The 47th Image Awards, was presented by the NAACP, commemorating roles, talents, and achievements of people of color in film, television, music and literature during the 2015 calendar year. This ceremony was hosted for the third time by Anthony Anderson on the TV One network.

American singer, songwriter and record producer John Legend received the President's Award for his humanitarian efforts, promoting the voting rights in the United States, education reform for all races and ethnicities and to be "widely read with respect to public policy reform, social justice reform and criminal justice reform".  American actor and singer Jussie Smollett, Brittany "Bree" Newsome, Rev. Dr. Otis Moss III, Rev. Dr. Howard-John Wesle, Rev. Dr. Jamal Harrison Bryant and the institution The University of Mississippi NAACP College Chapter and Justice League NYC, were honored with the Chairman's Award.

All nominees are listed below, and the winners are listed in bold.

Special Awards

Motion Picture

Awards adapted by Variety.

Outstanding Motion Picture

 Straight Outta Compton
 Beasts of No Nation
 Concussion
 Creed
 Dope

Outstanding Actor in a Motion Picture

 Michael B. Jordan - Creed
 Abraham Attah - Beasts of No Nation
 Chiwetel Ejiofor - Secret in Their Eyes
 Michael Ealy - The Perfect Guy
 Will Smith - Concussion

Outstanding Actress in a Motion Picture

 Sanaa Lathan - The Perfect Guy
 Keke Palmer - Brotherly Love
 Teyonah Parris - Chi-Raq
 Viola Davis - Lila and Eve
 Zoe Saldana - Infinitely Polar Bear

Outstanding Supporting Actor in a Motion Picture

 O'Shea Jackson Jr. - Straight Outta Compton
 Chiwetel Ejiofor - The Martian
 Corey Hawkins - Straight Outta Compton
 Forest Whitaker - Southpaw
 Idris Elba - Beasts of No Nation

Outstanding Supporting Actress in a Motion Picture

 Phylicia Rashad - Creed
 Angela Bassett - Chi-Raq
 Gugu Mbatha-Raw - Concussion
 Jennifer Hudson - Chi-Raq
 Tessa Thompson - Creed

Outstanding Writing in a Motion Picture

 Ryan Coogler and Aaron Covington - Creed
 Andrea Berloff and Jonathan Herman and Alan Wenkus - Straight Outta Compton
 Christopher Cleveland, Bettina Gilois, and Grant Thompson - McFarland USA
 Rick Famuyiwa - Dope

Outstanding Writing in a Motion Picture, Television

 Lawrence Hill and Clement Virgo - The Book of Negroes
 Dee Rees, and Christopher Cleveland, Bettina Gilois - Bessie
 Michael S. Bandy and Eric Stein - White Water
 Nzingha Stewart - With This Ring
 Shem Bitterman - Whitney

Outstanding Directing in a Motion Picture

 Ryan Coogler - Creed
 Rick Famuyiwa - Dope
 Alfonso Gomez-Rejon - Me and Earl and the Dying Girl
 Charles Stone III - Lila and Eve
 F. Gary Gray - Straight Outta Compton

Outstanding Directing in a Motion Picture, Television

 Dee Rees - Bessie
 Christine Swanson - For the Love of Ruth
 Nzingha Stewart - With This Ring
 Rusty Cundieff - White Water
 Salim Akil - The Start Up

Outstanding Independent Motion Picture

 Beasts of No Nation
 Brotherly Love
 Chi-Raq 
 Infinitely Polar Bear
 Secret in Their Eyes

Television

Outstanding Comedy Series
 black-ish
 House of Lies
 Key & Peele
 Orange is the New Black
 Survivor’s Remorse

Outstanding Actor in a Comedy Series
 Anthony Anderson - black-ish
 Andre Braugher - Brooklyn Nine-Nine
 Don Cheadle - House of Lies
 Dwayne Johnson - Ballers
 RonReaco Lee - Survivor’s Remorse

Outstanding Actress in a Comedy Series

 Tracee Ellis Ross - black-ish
 Gina Rodriguez - Jane The Virgin
 Loretta Devine - The Carmichael Show 
 Uzo Aduba - Orange is the New Black
 Wendy Raquel Robinson - The Game

Outstanding Supporting Actor in a Comedy Series

 Mike Epps - Survivor’s Remorse
 David Alan Grier - The Carmichael Show
 Laurence Fishburne - black-ish
 Miles Brown - black-ish
 Terry Crews - Brooklyn Nine-Nine

Outstanding Supporting Actress in a Comedy Series

 Marsai Martin - black-ish
 Anna Deavere Smith - Nurse Jackie
 Danielle Brooks - Orange is the New Black
 Laverne Cox - Orange is the New Black
 Tichina Arnold - Survivor’s Remorse

Outstanding Writing in a Comedy Series

 Kenya Barris: The Word - black-ish
 Alan Yang and Aziz Ansari : Master of None - Parents
 Jennie Snyder Urman: Chapter Twenty-Three - Jane The Virgin
 Jill Soloway: Kina Hora - Transparent
 Jordan Peele, Keegan-Michael Key, Jay Martel, Ian Roberts, Rebecca Drysdale, Colton Dunn, Phil Augusta Jackson, Alex Rubens, Charlie Sanders, and Rich Talarico: Y’all Ready For This? - Key & Peele

Outstanding Directing in a Comedy Series

 Don Cheadle - The Urge to Save Humanity is Almost Always a False Front for the Urge to Rule - House of Lies
 Aziz Ansari: Master of None - Parents
 Brad Silberling: Chapter Twenty-Three - Jane The Virgin
 Peter Atencio: The End - Key & Peele
 Stan Lathan: Cabin Pressure - Real Husbands of Hollywood

Outstanding Drama Series
 Empire
 Being Mary Jane
 How to Get Away with Murder
 Power
 Scandal

Outstanding Actor in a Drama Series
 Terrence Howard - Empire
 LL Cool J - NCIS: Los Angeles
 Morris Chestnut - Rosewood
 Omari Hardwick - Power
 Wesley Snipes - The Player

Outstanding Actress in a Drama Series

 Taraji P. Henson - Empire
 Gabrielle Union - Being Mary Jane
 Kerry Washington - Scandal
 Nicole Beharie - Sleepy Hollow
 Viola Davis - How to Get Away With Murder

Outstanding Supporting Actor in a Drama Series

 Joe Morton - Scandal
 Alfred Enoch - How to Get Away with Murder
 Bryshere Y. Gray - Empire
 Guillermo Díaz - Scandal
 Jussie Smollett - Empire

Outstanding Supporting Actress in a Drama Series
 Regina King - American Crime
 Cicely Tyson - How to Get Away with Murder
 Danai Gurira - The Walking Dead
 Grace Gealey - Empire
 Naturi Naughton - Power

Outstanding Writing in a Dramatic Series

 Mara Brock Akil, Jameal Turner, and Keli Goff : Sparrow - Being Mary Jane
 Erika Green Swafford and Doug Stockstill: Mama’s Here Now - How to Get Away with Murder
 John Ridley: Episode 1 - American Crime
 LaToya Morgan: False Flag - Turn: Washingtons Spies
 Lee Daniels and Danny Strong: Pilot - Empire

Outstanding Directing in a Dramatic Series
 John Ridley: Episode 1 - American Crime
 Ernest Dickerson: Welcome the Stranger - Hand of God
 Lee Daniels : Pilot - Empire
 Millicent Shelton: Episode Ten - American Crime
 Salim Akil: Sparrow - Being Mary Jane

Outstanding Television Movie, Mini-Series or Dramatic Special

 The Wiz Live!
 American Crime
 Bessie
 Luther
 The Book of Negroes

Outstanding Actor in a Television Movie, Mini-Series or Dramatic Special

 David Alan Grier - The Wiz Live!
 Cuba Gooding Jr. - The Book of Negroes
 David Oyelowo - Nightingale
 Idris Elba - Luther
 Michael Kenneth Williams - Bessie

Outstanding Actress in a Television Movie, Mini-Series or Dramatic Special

 Queen Latifah - Bessie
 Angela Bassett - American Horror Story: Hotel
 Aunjanue Ellis - The Book of Negroes
 Jill Scott - With this Ring
 LaTanya Richardson Jackson - Show Me a Hero

Outstanding News Information – Series or Special

 Unsung 
 Katrina: 10 Years After the Storm
 News One Now
 Oprah Prime: Celebrating Dr. King and the Selma Marches 50 Years Later
 Oprah: Where Are They Now?

Outstanding Talk Series

 The Talk
 Melissa Harris-Perry
 Steve Harvey
 The Daily Show with Trevor Noah
 The Wendy Williams Show

Outstanding Reality Program/Reality Competition Series

 Welcome to Sweetie Pie's
 Dancing with the Stars
 Iyanla: Fix My Life
 Shark Tank
 The Voice

Outstanding Variety, Series or Special

 Family Feud
 Black Girls Rock!
 Oprah's Master Class
 The Daily Show with Trevor Noah
 The Nightly Show with Larry Wilmore

Outstanding Children’s Program

 Doc McStuffins
 Dora and Friends
 K.C. Undercover
 Little Ballers
 Project Mc2

Outstanding Performance by a Youth - Series, Special, Television Movie or Mini-series

 Marcus Scribner - black-ish
 Hudson Yang - Fresh Off The Boat
 Marsai Martin - black-ish
 Miles Brown - black-ish
 Skai Jackson - Jessie

Outstanding Host in a News, Talk, Reality, or Variety (Series or Special)

 Steve Harvey - Family Feud
 Melissa Harris-Perry - Melissa Harris-Perry
 Bryant Gumbel - Real Sports with Bryant Gumbel
 Trevor Noah - The Daily Show with Trevor Noah
 Larry Wilmore - The Nightly Show with Larry Wilmore

Documentary

Outstanding Documentary

 The Black Panthers: Vanguard of the Revolution
 Amy
 Dreamcatcher
 In My Father's House
 What Happened, Miss Simone?

Outstanding Documentary, Television

 Muhammad Ali: The Peoples Champ
 August Wilson: The Ground on Which I Stand
 Belief
 Kareem: Minority of One
 Light Girls

Animated

Outstanding Character Voice-Over Performance – Television or Film

 Loretta Devine - Doc McStuffins
 Aisha Tyler - Archer
 Audra McDonald - Doc McStuffins
 Ricky Guillart - Milo Murphy's Law
 Jeffrey Wright - The Good Dinosaur Wanda Sykes - Penn Zero

Music

Outstanding New Artist

 Jussie Smollett Andra Day Judith Hill The Weeknd YazzOutstanding Male Artist

 Pharrell Williams Charlie Wilson Kendrick Lamar The Weeknd Tyrese GibsonOutstanding Female Artist

 Jill Scott Janet Jackson Jazmine Sullivan Lalah Hathaway Lauryn HillOutstanding Duo, Group or Collaboration

 Empire Cast featuring Estelle & Jussie Smollett - Conqueror
 Original Broadway Cast - Hamilton: An American Musical
 Janet Jackson featuring J. Cole - No Sleeep
 Big Sean featuring Kanye West and John Legend - One Man Can Change The World
 Alabama Shakes - Sound & Color

Outstanding Jazz Album

 Miles Davis - Miles Davis at Newport 1955-1975: The Bootleg Series Vol. 4 Terell Stafford Quintet - BrotherLEE Love: Celebrating Lee Morgan Dee Dee Bridgewater, Irvin Mayfield, and New Orleans Jazz Orchestra - Dee Dee's Feathers Erroll Garner - The Complete Concert By The Sea Kamasi Washington - The EpicOutstanding Gospel Album – Traditional or Contemporary

 Tina Campbell - It's Personal Kim Burrell - A Different Place Kirk Franklin - Losing My Religion Kirk Whalum - The Gospel According To Jazz – Chapter IV Marvin Sapp - You Shall LiveOutstanding Music Video

 Tyrese Gibson - Shame The Weeknd - Can't Feel My Face Pharrell Williams - Freedom Janet Jackson featuring J. Cole - No Sleeep Alabama Shakes - Sound & ColorOutstanding Song, Contemporary

 Empire Cast featuring Jussie Smollett and Yazz - You're So Beautiful Empire Cast feat. Estelle & Jussie Smollett - Conqueror Pharrell Williams - Freedom Janet Jackson feat. J. Cole - No Sleeep Janet Jackson - Unbreakable

Outstanding Song, Traditional

 Jill Scott - Back Together Seal - Every Time I’m with You
 Lauryn Hill - Feeling Good
 Charlie Wilson - Goodnight Kisses
 Jazmine Sullivan - Let It BurnOutstanding Album

 Jill Scott - Woman The Weeknd - Beauty Behind the Madness Empire Cast - Empire: Original Soundtrack from Season 1 Charlie Wilson - Forever Charlie Janet Jackson - UnbreakableLiterature

Outstanding Literary Work – Fiction

 Victoria Christopher Murrary- Stand Your Ground Ravi Howard - Driving the King Tananarive Due - Ghost Summer: Stories ReShonda Tate Billingsley - Mama’s Boy Chinelo Okparanta - Under the Udala TreesOutstanding Literary Work – Non-Fiction

 Spectacle: The Astonishing Life of Ota Benga - Pamela Newkirk
 50 Billion Dollar Boss: African American Women Sharing Stories of Success in Entrepreneurship and Leadership - Kathey Porter and Andrea Hoffman
 Ghettoside: A True Story of Murder in America - Jill Leovy
 SHOWDOWN: Thurgood Marshall and the Supreme Court Nomination That Changed America - Wil Haygood
 The Light of the World - Elizabeth Alexander

Outstanding Literary Work – Debut Author

 The Fishermen - Chigozie Obioma Between the World and Me - Ta-Nehisi Coates 
 The Star Side of Bird Hill - Naomi Jackson The Turner House - Angela Flournoy The Wind In The Reeds: A Storm, A Play And The City That Could Not Be Broken - Wendell Pierce and Rod Dreher

Outstanding Literary Work – Biography/ Auto-Biography

 Between The World and Me - Ta-Nehisi Coates After the Dance: My Life with Marvin Gaye - Jan Gaye One Righteous Man: Samuel Battle and the Shattering of the Color Line in New York - Arthur Browne Power Forward: My Presidential Education - Reggie Love Year of Yes: How to Dance It Out, Stand In the Sun and Be Your Own Person - Shonda RhimesOutstanding Literary Work – Instructional

 Soul Food Love: Healthy Recipes Inspired by One Hundred Years of Cooking in a Black Family - Alice Randall and Caroline Randall Williams
 Big Words to Little Me: Tips and Advice for the Younger Self - Sakina Ibrahim and Jessie Lee
 Free Your Mind: An African American Guide to Meditation and Freedom - Cortez R. Rainey
 Grandbaby Cakes: Modern Recipes, Vintage Charm, Soulful Memories - Jocelyn Delk Adams
 Keep Calm… It’s Just Real Estate: Your No-Stress Guide To Buying A Home - Egypt Sherrod

Outstanding Literary Work – Poetry

 How to Be Drawn - Terrance Hayes
 Catalog of Unabashed Gratitude - Ross Gay
 Reconnaissance - Carl Phillips
 Redbone - Mahogany L. Browne
 Wild Hundreds - Nate Marshall

Outstanding Literary Work – Children

 Gordon Parks How the Photographer Captured Black and White America - Carole Boston Weatherford
 Chasing Freedom: The Life Journeys of Harriet Tubman and Susan B. Anthony, Inspired by Historical Facts - Nikki Grimes
 Granddaddy’s Turn: A Journey to the Ballot Box - Michael S. Bandy and Eric Stein
 If You Plant a Seed - Kadir Nelson
 New Shoes - Susan Lynn Meyer

Outstanding Literary Work – Youth/Teens

 X: A Novel - Ilyasah Shabazz and Kekla Magoon
 Rhythm Ride: A Road Trip Through the Motown Sound - Andrea Davis Pinkney
 Stella By Starlight - Sharon Draper
 Untwine - Edwidge Danticat
 You Are Wonderfully Made: 12 Life-Changing Principles for Teen Girls to Embrace'' - Gwen Richardson and Sylvia Daye Richardson

References

NAACP Image Awards
N
N
N
NAACP Image
2016 awards in the United States